Juvanje is a small settlement on the left bank of the Savinja River in the Municipality of Ljubno in Slovenia. The area belongs to the traditional region of Styria and is now included in the Savinja Statistical Region.

References

External links
Juvanje on Geopedia

Populated places in the Municipality of Ljubno